Diether Lambrechts (born 1976) is a Belgian geneticist and professor at the KU Leuven and VIB. He is the director of the Vesalius Research Center. Lambrechts is known for his multidisciplinary approach to dissecting tumor biology. Major scientific contributions include identifying oxygen supply regulation as an anti-cancer treatment strategy.

In 2013, Lambrechts was awarded an ERC Consolidator award.

Sources

 

1976 births
Living people
Belgian geneticists
People from Hasselt
European Research Council grantees